Holy Resurrection Monastery is an American monastic community of men. Under the canon law of the Eastern Catholic Churches the brotherhood is a self-governing (sui juris) monastery within the Romanian Catholic Eparchy of St George's in Canton, Ohio, and located in St. Nazianz, Wisconsin.  The ruling hierarch is Bishop John Michael Botean; the abbot of the monastery is Archimandrite Nicholas Zachariadis.

It was founded in 1995 with the blessing of Bishop George Kuzma of the Byzantine Catholic Eparchy of Van Nuys. The monastery was transferred to the Romanian Catholic Church in 2005 at the monks' request and with the consent of the Holy See.  Around the same time Bishop John Michael blessed the canonical establishment of Holy Theophany Monastery as a monastic community of nuns.

These communities are committed to a revival of traditional Eastern Christian monastic life within the Catholic Church.  Among other things, they follow the traditional liturgical and fasting regulations of the Byzantine tradition, shared with most Eastern Orthodox churches.  They follow the traditional degrees of Eastern Orthodox monasticism.

Holy Resurrection Monastery comprises seven stavrophore monks in solemn vows (including the abbot) and two rassophore or novice monks. Holy Theophany comprises three stavrophore nuns and one rassophore.

Gallery

References

External links
Holy Resurrection Monastery website
Romanian Catholic Eparchy of St. George in Canton website

Eastern Catholicism in Ohio
Romanian-American culture in Ohio
Eastern Catholic monasteries
1995 establishments in Wisconsin
Religious organizations established in 1995
Eastern Catholic buildings and structures in North America